DUV may refer to one of the following

DUV, "Druck- und Verlagshaus Frankfurt am Main", the publisher Frankfurter Rundschau
Dampfkessel Überwachungsverein (DÜV), German organizations founded in the 19th century to ensure the technical safety of steam boilers
Diffey weighted UV irradiance
Deep ultraviolet